Murray Hantman (1904–1999) was a painter, muralist, and teacher. Over the course of his career Hantman's work progressed from realism to abstraction. Based in New York City, Hantman spent summers on Monhegan Island.

Like many of his generation, Hantman ultimately rejected explicit narrative in his paintings for a more primal expression of experience.

References 

1904 births
1999 deaths
Modern painters
20th-century American painters
American male painters
20th-century American male artists